The 1999 Heineken Open was a men's ATP tennis tournament held in Auckland, New Zealand. It was the 32nd edition of the tournament and was held from 11 January to 18 January 1999 and was played on outdoor hard courts. Unseeded Sjeng Schalken won the singles title.

Finals

Singles

 Sjeng Schalken defeated  Tommy Haas 6–4, 6–4
 It was Schalken's 1st title of the year and the 5th of his career.

Doubles

 Jeff Tarango /  Daniel Vacek defeated  Jiří Novák /  David Rikl 7–5, 7–5
 It was Tarango's 1st title of the year and the 9th of his career. It was Vacek's 1st title of the year and the 21st of his career.

References

External links
 ATP – tournament profile
 ITF – tournament edition details

Heineken Open
Heineken
ATP Auckland Open
January 1999 sports events in New Zealand